Raffaele Sacco (August 14, 1787 – January 20, 1872) was an Italian optician and lyricist. He was the reputed inventor of the aletoscope, an apparatus to verify the authenticity of stamps, wax seals, etc.

Born in Naples, he was the author of the words to one of the most known Neapolitan songs, "Te voglio bene assaje" (the music is by Gaetano Donizetti), the song that won the first Festival of Neapolitan Sing in 1835.

See also
Music of Naples

1787 births
1872 deaths
Musicians from Naples
Italian songwriters
Male songwriters
19th-century Italian musicians
19th-century Italian male musicians